"Samba pa ti" is an instrumental by Latin rock band Santana, from their 1970 album, Abraxas. In English, the title means "Samba for You." It was released as a single in 1973. The song charted at No. 11 in the Netherlands, No. 43 on the German charts, and No. 27 on the UK Singles Chart, Santana's first single to chart in the United Kingdom.

The song was written by Carlos Santana after he witnessed a jazz saxophonist playing in the street outside his apartment. In 2008, Santana told Mojo that "Samba Pa Ti" was the first song he felt he could call his own.

""Samba Pa Ti" was conceived in New York City on a Sunday afternoon,"..."I opened the window I saw this man in the street, he was drunk and he had a saxophone and a bottle of booze in his back pocket. And I kept looking at him because he kept struggling with himself. He couldn’t make up his mind which one to put in his mouth first, the saxophone or the bottle and I immediately heard a song"..."I wrote the whole thing right there"—Carlos Santana

"Samba Pa Ti" is one of the group's most popular and acclaimed songs, and it is still in the band's tour set lists.

In 1974 the song was covered by Bruno Battisti D'Amario and Edda Dell'Orso for the album Samba para ti. It was later covered by José Feliciano with added lyrics on his 1982 album Escenas de Amor, by Ottmar Liebert on his 1992 album Solo para ii, by Gato Barbieri on the Fania All Stars 1981 album Social Change, and also by Angélique Kidjo, who put lyrics in Yoruba on her album Oyo. It is also one of the tracks featured in Nick Hornby's book, Songbook.

Personnel 
 Carlos Santana – electric guitar, composer, producer
 David Brown – bass guitar
 Gregg Rolie – Hammond organ
 Michael Carabello – congas
 José Areas – timbales
 Michael Shrieve – drums

References 
Citations

Bibliography
 

1969 singles
Santana (band) songs
1967 songs
Columbia Records singles
Songs written by Carlos Santana